Shale Mohammad also known as  Mohammad Saleh (born 1 February 1977) is an Indian politician serving as the Cabinet Minister of Minority Affairs of the state of Rajasthan since 2018. He belongs to the Indian National Congress party.

Personal life
Mohammad's father is Gazi Fakir, who is a Muslim religious leader. Fakir is influential amongst the Sindhi Muslims.

Political career

Early career
In 2000, Mohammad became the head of Jaisalmer Panchayat samiti at the age of 23.

In 2013 Rajasthan Legislative Assembly election, Mohammad was defeated by Bharatiya Janata Party candidate Shaitan Singh by a margin of approximately 35,000 votes. In 2008 Rajasthan Legislative Assembly election, he won from the newly created Pokhran assembly constituency by a margin of 339 votes. However, he lost to Shaitan Singh in the next election.

Cabinet minister
In 2018 Rajasthan Legislative Assembly election, Mohammad was pitted against Bharatiya Janata Party candidate Mahant Pratap Puri. Pratap Puri is a Hindu saint and is the mahant (chief priest) of Taratara sect. According to political observers, by fielding the mahant against Mohammad, the party was trying to fight anti-incumbency by polarising the Hindu voters. Mohammad defeated Pratap Puri by a margin of 872 votes.

Subsequently, Mohammad was made a cabinet minister in the third Gehlot ministry and became the first ever politician from Jaisalmer district to get a ministry. He took charge over the ministry of Minority affairs, and took oath on 25 December 2018.

Controversy
In August 2013, an FIR was lodged against Mohammad for allegedly issuing threats to IPS officer Pankaj Choudhary following an argument at a petrol pump.

References

1977 births
Living people
People from Rajasthan
People from Jaisalmer district
Indian National Congress politicians
Rajasthan MLAs 2018–2023